David Francis Marks (born 1945) is a psychologist, author and editor of numerous articles and books largely concerned with five areas of psychological research – judgement, health psychology, consciousness, parapsychology and intelligence. Marks is also the originator of the General Theory of Behaviour, and has curated exhibitions and books about artists and their works.

Biography
Marks was born 12 February 1945 in Liphook, Hampshire, England to Victor W.F. Marks and Mary Dorothy (née Goodman) Marks.

Marks earned a BSc at University of Reading in 1966 and a PhD at University of Sheffield in 1970. From there, he moved to New Zealand where he taught at the University of Otago as lecturer then senior lecturer in psychology. He returned to the UK as Head of the School of Psychology at Middlesex University before working at City University London from 2000 to 2010. He founded the Journal of Health Psychology and Health Psychology Open, an open access journal. 

His late brother Jon Marks was a jazz musician. He has two children. His daughter, Jessica Marks, is a chef working in New Zealand. His son, Michael Marks, is a  teacher of business studies in Ware, Hertfordshire, England. David Marks retired from his university post in 2010 and lives in Arles, Provence-Alpes-Côte d’Azur, France.

Memberships
British Psychological Society (Fellow)
Committee for the Scientific Investigation of the Paranormal (now the Committee for Skeptical Inquiry)(Fellow)

Judgement
For his doctoral research at the University of Sheffield Marks carried out laboratory studies on subjective probability judgements. He found that subjects typically used a simplifying strategy or heuristic to manage probability revision in a Bayesian decision task (Marks and Clarkson, 1972). In 1968 Marks had contacted Amos Tversky about his findings. A paper reporting the same representativeness heuristic was published by Kahneman and Tversky in 1972.  

Switching to another aspect of judgement, Marks then ran an experiment on relative subjective probability judgements demonstrating that relative judgements of the more probable of two statements are quicker if the statements are both probable rather than improbable. For judgements of the less probable, the reverse result is obtained. Marks proposed a theory that judgement involves a relation between a stimulus and a word acting as a reference point and he followed Louis Leon Thurstone's suggestion that stimuli differ in their discriminal dispersions; see Law of comparative judgment. Marks' (1972) reference point theory of relative judgement is found to be consistent with results in psycholinguistics. Four decades later, Dawn Chen, Hongjing Lu and Keith Holyoak (2014) confirmed Marks' theory in a computational realization by demonstrating that: "Reference points cued by the form of comparative questions systematically modulate the precision of magnitudes represented in working memory, yielding the semantic congruity effect" (Chen, Lu and Holyoak, 2014, p. 46).

Health psychology
In his work on health psychology Marks advocated a greater understanding of the socio-political context affecting individual behaviour (Marks et al., 2005).  With Michael Murray and colleagues he actively promoted a critical-theoretical approach, including the foundation of the International Society of Critical Health Psychology.  This organisation has included the consideration of social justice, community approaches, and arts projects for the reduction of health inequalities. Marks has also been interested in new research methods for clinical psychology and health psychology (Marks & Yardley, 2004).

David Marks' first project in the health psychology area was concerned with the effects of cannabis use which, in the 1970s, was an illegal substance in the majority of Western countries and a subject of social concern, especially when mixed with alcohol and driving. With Professor Peter McKellar at the University of Otago, Marks obtained funding from the Medical, now Health Research Council of New Zealand, to carry out double-blind randomised controlled trials to investigate the acute effects of cannabis intoxication, e.g. "Cannabis and Temporal Disintegration in Experienced and Naive Subjects", subsequently published in  Science. A series of masters and doctoral students including Sally Casswell and Annette Beautrais submitted this research for their PhD or MSc dissertations.

His second project in health psychology concerned designing psychological therapy for smoking cessation. This research began with another doctoral student, Paul Sulzberger, at the University of Otago where they developed the Isis Smoking Cessation Programme (Sulzberger & Marks, 1977). After returning to England in 1986 Marks developed a UK version of the programme which was originally published by the British Psychological Society in 1993 as The QUIT FOR LIFE Programme (Marks 1993, 2005). The approach was developed further and re-published in the 'Overcoming' series by Robinson as "Overcoming Your Smoking Habit" (Marks 2005).

Conceptualizing methods for the design, description and evaluation of interventions has been a complex challenge for the discipline of Psychology. Marks (2009) published a Taxonomic System for psychological interventions.

In 2015, Marks published a new theoretical explanation of obesity based on the concept of homeostasis, a property of all living things (Marks, 2015). Physiological homeostasis maintains equilibrium at set-points using feedback loops for optimum functioning of the organism. Long-term imbalances in homeostasis arise though genetic, environmental or biopsychosocial mechanisms causing illness and/or loss of well-being. Psychological homeostasis works in a similar fashion to maintain stability in emotion and behaviour. However, rapid environmental and economic changes generate challenging conditions for the human organism.  Over-consumption of high-caloric, low-nutrient foods, combined with stressful living and working conditions, have caused imbalances in homeostasis, overweight and obesity in more than two billion people.

Annunziato and Grossman (2016) explain that Marks' homeostasis theory attributes the obesity imbalance to a “Circle of Discontent”, a system of feedback loops linking weight gain, body dissatisfaction, negative affect, and overconsumption. These authors state that the theory is consistent with an extensive evidence base. Annunziato and Grossman (2016) indicate that the homeostasis theory focuses on five feedback loops that form an insidious and vicious "Circle of Discontent". If for any reason high levels of dissatisfaction, negative affect, consumption, or increased body weight should arise, then interactivity through feedback loops a vicious circle is created, a disturbance to the stability of the system that controls weight gain. When it becomes activated, the system drifts away from equilibrium toward a dysfunctional state of non-control.  The authors explain that Marks (2015) proposes a four-armed strategy to halt the obesity epidemic consists of (1) putting a stop to victim-blaming, stigma, and discrimination; (2) devalorizing the thin-ideal; (3) reducing consumption of energy-dense, low-nutrient foods, and drinks; and (4) improving access to plant-based diets. Annunziato and Grossman (2016) concluded: "If fully implemented, interventions designed to restore homeostasis have the potential to halt the obesity epidemic".

The Homeostasis Theory of Obesity was further elaborated in his 2016 book, Obesity. Comfort vs. Discontent (Marks, 2016). The book's dedication states: "To the two-point-one billion people who are overweight or living with obesity. Please take note. It is not your fault. You are not to blame. You are the victims. Be informed, be empowered, and, above all else, resist. This book is for you." (Marks, 2016).

Marks further elaborated the theory of Psychological Homeostasis in a General Theory of Behaviour, which he published as a book in 2018.

Consciousness research
Marks' research into consciousness and mental imagery led to the development of the Vividness of Visual Imagery Questionnaire, a tool for the assessment of individual differences in visual imagery. Marks (1973) reported that high vividness scores correlate with the accuracy of recall of coloured photographs. In 1995 he published a new version of the VVIQ, the VVIQ2. This questionnaire consists of twice the number of items and reverses the rating scale so that higher scores reflect higher vividness. The VVIQ has been validated in about 2000 studies using perceptual and cognitive tasks.

Rodway, Gillies and Schepman (2006) found that high vividness participants were significantly more accurate at detecting salient changes to pictures compared to low vividness participants, replicating an earlier study by Gur and Hilgard (1975).  Recently Cui et al. (2007) found that reported image vividness correlates with increased activity in the visual cortex. This study shows that the subjective experience of forming a mental image is reflected by increased visual cortical activity. Logie, Pernet, Buonocore and Della Sala  (2011) used behavioural and fMRI data for mental rotation from individuals reporting vivid and poor imagery on the VVIQ. Groups differed in brain activation patterns suggesting that the groups performed the same tasks in different ways. These findings help to explain the lack of association previously reported between VVIQ scores and mental rotation performance. Lee, Kravitz and Baker (2012) used fMRI and multi-voxel pattern analysis to investigate the specificity, distribution, and similarity of information for individual seen and imagined objects. Participants either viewed or imagined individual named object images on which they had been trained prior to the scan. Correlation between fMRI and VVIQ scores showed that, in both object-selective and early visual cortex, Lee et al.'s (2012) measure of discrimination across imagery and perception correlated with the vividness of imagery.

Parapsychology, skepticism and zeteticism
In his work on parapsychology, Marks initially adopted a skeptical analysis of paranormal claims. He and his colleague Richard Kammann became associated with the committee of professional skeptics now called Committee for Skeptical Inquiry. Marks visited the University of Oregon on a six-month sabbatical in 1976 to carry out research with Ray Hyman.  While in the US Marks also visited two researchers at the Stanford Research Institute Russell Targ and Harold Puthoff who had carried out multiple studies of remote viewing which they had published in Nature. After Puthoff and Targ refused to give David Marks access to their remote viewing data, Marks approached the judge of the transcripts, Arthur Hastings, who allowed him full access. In his analysis Marks found multiple clues in the unedited transcripts that allowed the target descriptions  to be correctly matched to the listing of target sites showing these sites in the actual order in which they had been visited. Marks subsequently published an article in Nature demonstrating that the original claims of remote viewing experiments were based on flawed experimental procedures. 

Marks also published evidence in The Psychology of the Psychic (1980, 2nd edn. 2000; co-authored with the late Richard Kammann; forewords to both editions by Martin Gardner) that Uri Geller was able to hoodwink scientists, journalists and the many members of the public with a series of simple but audacious sleights of hand. In that book, which investigates anomalistic psychology and describes case studies of paranormal claims together with a set of principles for explaining how people may come to believe so strongly in the paranormal claims. This includes the concept of subjective validation, a process through which people find a correspondence between randomly paired events, including coincidences (Marks, 2000). In 1986, while working in New Zealand with the late Denis Dutton, Marks co-founded the NZ Skeptics. He is a fellow of the Committee for Skeptical Inquiry (CSI).

His habitual attitude of open skepticism was later applied to the self-proclaimed 'skeptics' themselves. Marks became convinced that the leading members of the Committee for Skeptical Inquiry such as Ray Hyman, Paul Kurtz and James Randi were actually "pseudoskeptics", i.e. disbelievers, who were never open to the possibility of the paranormal in the first place. Their disbelief would be as susceptible to subjective validation as the positive beliefs of non-skeptics. Thus Marks came to adopt a position similar to that of Marcello Truzzi in advocating "zeteticism". Marks' 2020 book "Psychology and the Paranormal: Exploring Anomalous Experience" presents a new theory holding that, if they occur at all, paranormal experiences such as telepathy and clairvoyance are never under conscious control and only occur spontaneously. The theory explains why self-proclaimed psychics such as Uri Geller cannot produce paranormal effects in the laboratory and why laboratory experiments in Parapsychology normally fail.

Regarding Marks' book, Adrian Parker ('Informal Psi Tests', Paranormal Review 96, 16), President of the Society for Psychical Research, commented:

"The veteran psi-critic David Marks has recently published a book Psychology and the Paranormal in which he has taken a softer position concerning the paranormal.  He argues that the phenomena may occur, but that they are inherently spontaneous and elusive, and because of this they cannot be captured in the lab. According to Marks, parapsychologists and their critics should resolve their differences and accept this. Such a challenge obviously goes against all the ethos and efforts of academic parapsychology at UK Universities, such as Northampton, which follow the basic belief of Joseph Banks Rhine that by piecing together numerous factors and personality- traits, a degree of control over psi can eventually be achieved. This is the successful working model used throughout applied psychology where psvchological testing predicts job performance and is used even to some extent for diagnostics in clinical psychology.  Marks's challenge also goes against my own efforts to show that altered states of consciousness are the royal road to reliably reproducing lifting psi-in-the-wild to psi-in- the-lab. In particular, we developed a version of the ganzfeld using real-time recordings that could actually catch the sender's experiences of target film clips in the form of the receiver's imagery, since these ganzfeld images are often shown to follow in real time the changing scenes being watched in the target clip.

Nevertheless, there may be some truth in Marks's assertion. Some of the best cases of ESP seem to occur before controls can be brought in, only to disappear when they are brought in".

Intelligence – Literacy theory of IQ test score variations across time and space
In 2010, David Marks systematically analysed the association between literacy skills and intelligence quotient(IQ) across time, nationality, and race. Marks (2010) published a sceptical theory of IQ score variations explaining both the Flynn effect and the alleged racial variations in IQ as an artefact (error) stemming from uncontrolled literacy differences. Marks (2010) hypothesized that IQ differences across time, race and nationality are all caused by differences in literacy because intelligence test performance requires literacy skills not present in all people to the same extent. In eight different analyses mean full scale IQ and literacy scores yielded correlations ranging from .79 to .99.

Kaufmann (2010) explained the significance of Marks' study as follows. If increasing literacy were really explaining a number of seemingly different IQ trends, then you would expect to see a few different phenomena.  First, within a population you should expect increased education of literacy skills to be associated with an increase in the average IQ of that population. Second, IQ gains should be most pronounced in the lower half of the IQ bell curve since this is the section of the population that prior to the education would have obtained relatively lower scores due to their inability to comprehend the intelligence test's instructions. With increased literacy, you should expect to see a change in the skewness of the IQ distribution from positive to negative as a result of higher rates of literacy in the lower half of the IQ distribution (but very little change in the top half of the distribution). You should also expect to see differences on the particular intelligence test subscales, with increased literacy showing the strongest effects on verbal tests of intelligence and minimal differences on other tests of intelligence. If all these predictions hold up, there would be support for the notion that secular IQ gains and race differences are not different phenomena but have a common origin in literacy.

Kaufman described how Marks tested these predictions by looking at samples representative of whole populations (rather than individuals), and used ecological methods to compute statistical associations between IQ and literacy rates across different countries. Kaufman's (2010) review suggested that Marks' findings were completely consistent with the predictions: (i) The higher the literacy rate of a population, the higher that population's mean IQ, and the higher that population's mean IQ, the higher the literacy rate of that population. (ii) When literacy rates declined, mean IQ also declined, a reversed Flynn Effect. (iii) Unequal improvements occurred across the entire IQ spectrum with the greatest increases in the lower half of the IQ distribution. Kaufman pointed out that the evidence suggested that both the Flynn Effect and racial/national IQ differences showed the largest effects of literacy on verbal tests of intelligence, with the perceptual tests of intelligence showing no consistent pattern.

The alleged association between race and intelligence and also the Flynn effect both have a similar explanation: literacy differences across race and across time are, Marks believes, the cause of both. Racial IQ differences are converging as the literacy skills within two populations become more equal. Thus racial differences have an environmental cause, just like the Flynn effect. Essentially, both the Flynn effect and racial differences in measured IQ are artefacts of literacy differences. As the literacy of Western populations declines, as appears to be the case currently, then Marks' literacy theory of IQ scores predicts that average IQ test scores is expected to decline, and the Flynn effect will go into reverse, which is exactly what recent studies have found.

A General Theory of Behaviour 
All sciences are founded on general theories: Biology has the theory of evolution; Physics, the theory of relativity; Chemistry, the theory of molecular quantum mechanics; and Geology, the theory of plate tectonics. Psychology has no general theory. In his 2018 monograph, 'A General Theory of Behaviour' (GTB), David Marks (2018) attempts to fill that gap with a central theory covering all areas of the discipline.

Many psychological theories are species-specific, situation-specific, or sub-area specific so cannot be general theories. 'A General Theory of Behaviour' applies to all sub-areas, situations, species, ages, stages, genders, and cultures. The only proviso for the GTB is that the organism must have consciousness.

The theory consists of 20 principles and 80 propositions, in total, 100 empirically falsifiable propositions. These 100 propositions make the GTB transparent and capable of falsification.
In embracing intentionality, purpose and desire, the GTB is non-reductive while, at the same time, drawing upon principles from other sciences, in particular, Biology and Physiology. Following Claude Bernard, Walter B. Cannon and others, David Marks advocates the usefulness of the concept of 'Psychological Homeostasis' and explains the implications for the Science of Behaviour.

The GTB asserts that organisms are not adapted to each other and the environment because natural selection made them that way, but they are made that way owing to an inbuilt striving towards stability and equilibrium.  The GTB has the potential to advance understanding of human nature and to integrate the discipline of Psychology. The next steps involve rigorous testing of the principles and hypotheses of the General Theory.

Selected books
A General Theory of Behaviour
Health Psychology: Theory, Research and Practice with Michael Murray and Emee Vida Estacio (Sixth Edition, 2020)
Reussir a surmonter le Reflex cigarette (French Edition)(2009)
Overcoming Your Smoking Habit: A Self-Help Guide Using Cognitive Behavioral Techniques (2005)
Research Methods for Clinical and Health Psychology with Lucy Yardley (2004)
The Health Psychology Reader (2002)
Dealing with Dementia: Recent European Research with Catherine Marie Sykes (2000)
Improving the Health of the Nation: The Failure of the Government's Health Reforms with Colin Francome (1996)
The Quit for Life Programme: An Easier Way to Quit Smoking and Not Start Again (Stuart MacGregor, Illustrator)(1993)
Theories of Image Formation (editor) (1986)
Imagery One (editor with David G. Russell) (1985)
The Psychology of the Psychic with Richard Kammann (1980 and 2000)
The Isis Smoking Cessation Programme with Paul Sulzberger (1977)

Selected articles
Homeostatic theory of obesity (2015)
IQ variations across time, race, and nationality: an artifact of differences in literacy skills (2010)
Investigating the paranormal (1986)
Visual imagery differences in the recall of pictures (1973)
New Directions for Mental Imagery Research (1995)
On the review of The Psychology of the Psychic: A reply to Dr. Morris" (1981)
Cannabis and Temporal Disintegration in Experienced and Naive Subjects with Sally Casswell (1973)

References

Further reading
Morris, Robert L. (1980). "Some comments on the assessment of parapsychological studies" [review of the book The Psychology of the psychic] Journal of the American Society for Psychical Research The Society for Psychical Research (SPR), 74, 425–443.

External links
Standing against racism | The Psychologist
 ISCHP2011: 7th Biennial ISCHP Conference, Adelaide (South Australia)
 Review of The Psychology of the Psychic
 Review of The Health Psychology Reader
 PDF of controlled trial of the QUIT FOR LIFE Programme
 

1945 births
Living people
Alumni of the University of Reading
Alumni of the University of Sheffield
Academics of City, University of London
Anomalistic psychology
British psychologists
Critics of parapsychology
Academic staff of the University of Otago
English sceptics
People from Liphook